This was the first edition of the tournament.

Hans Podlipnik-Castillo and Andrei Vasilevski won the title after defeating Clément Geens and Juan Pablo Paz 6–4, 6–2 in the final.

Seeds

Draw

External Links
 Main Draw

Shymkent Challenger - Doubles
2017 Doubles